Benjamin Delmas (born 17 May 1976) is a French former competitive ice dancer. He had the most success with partner Alia Ouabdelsselam. They teamed up in 1997 and split in 2002. During their career, they won the 2002 French Figure Skating Championships and placed as high as 13th at the European Figure Skating Championships.

Before teaming up with Ouabdelsselam, Delmas competed with Barbara Piton and Myriam Parry.

Programs 
(with Ouabdelsselam)

Results
GP: Grand Prix

With Ouabdelsselam

With Parry

With Piton

References

External links
 
 Official site 
 Alia Ouabdelsselam / Benjamin Delmas at Tracings.net

French male ice dancers
1976 births
Living people
People from Châlons-en-Champagne
Sportspeople from Marne (department)